A man catcher, also known as catchpole, is a type of pole weapon.

History

It was used in Europe as late as the 18th century.
The European design consisted of a pole mounted with a two pronged head. Each prong was semi-circular in shape with a spring-loaded "door" on the front. This created an effective valve that would allow the ring to pass around a man-sized cylinder and keep it trapped. The man catcher was used primarily to pull a person from horseback and drag him to the ground where he could be helplessly pinned. This is one of the few examples of less-lethal polearms.

The design assumes that the captured person wears armor to protect him against the metal prongs, which could easily hurt the neck of a person without armor. The man catcher was also used to trap and contain violent prisoners.

Similarly, the Japanese sodegarami, tsukubō, and sasumata were used by Edo-era law enforcement for apprehending suspects. However, the sasumata was most like a man catcher in usage as its forked head was designed to pin the suspect's neck, legs, arms, or joints against a wall or the ground.

Modern variants

Japan

While other man catchers are no longer in use, the sasumata (described above) currently has modern variants that are semi-flexible, with padding, blunt endpoints, and other slightly modified geometry, designed to significantly reduce the chance of injury to restrained civilians. These variants are designed for use by non-soldiers—specifically, they are intended for use by a Japanese riot police mounted on horseback. In such a case, the mounted riot police would typically be  arranged in formation line abreast, and would use a row of raised sasumata to hold back large crowds. These mounted riot police answer to the Japanese National Police Agency. Since the outbreak of serious riots is uncommon in Japan, the modern sasumata is rarely used. Nevertheless, the necessary training is kept up to date.

China
A type of locking man catcher is available for staff at train stations and airports in China to capture and restrain individuals in a non-lethal manner.

In some junior and middle schools, security guards are equipped with non-locking variants designed to seize a person's waist or prevent them from advancing. It is essentially a two-pronged fork, a U-shape projecting from a pole.

India and Nepal
During the COVID-19 pandemic in India, police in Chandigarh implemented a mechanical device resembling a man catcher in order to capture suspects while maintaining a safe social distance. It was created to be used on a person's waistline. They called it a "social distancing clamp" or a "lockdown-breaker catcher". It was based on an idea from police in Nepal, where officers have reportedly detained over 1,400 suspects using a similar "multifunctional arrest device". Mancatchers were also used for other purposes such as pulling dead bodies out of the water. The main difference between the designs is that those used in India expand the size of the clamp depending on the person's waistline.

See also
Monk's spade, one end has similar function but for animals
Sasumata - In Japan case

References

External links
 

Polearms